Georg Konrad Morgen (8 June 1909 – 4 February 1982) was an SS judge and lawyer who investigated crimes committed in Nazi concentration camps. He rose to the rank of SS-Sturmbannführer (major). After the war, Morgen served as witness at several anti-Nazi trials and continued his legal career in Frankfurt.

Morgen was known as a Blutrichter, or 'blood judge', as a result of being one of the members of the judiciary authorised to issue the death penalty. A mistranslation of this may also be the reason that he earned the nickname 'The Bloodhound Judge', said to be for his determination and doggedness in achieving justice.

Early life and war service
Born to a railwayman in Frankfurt, Morgen graduated from the University of Frankfurt and The Hague Academy of International Law, before becoming a judge in Stettin. Morgen joined the Nazi Party on 1 April 1933, and had joined the SS in March. He was dismissed for acquitting a teacher who had been brought up on charges of excessive corporal punishment, probably at the instigation of the Hitler Youth. At the outbreak of the war, he entered the Waffen-SS and was sent for basic military training. After the invasion of France in 1940, he was demobilized and employed as a judge in the SS Judiciary, which assigned him to its court in Kraków. In Kraków he investigated several highly placed SS officers for corruption, including Hermann Fegelein, a favorite of Heinrich Himmler's and the future brother-in-law of Eva Braun. He also exposed one of Fegelein's co-conspirators, Jaroslawa Mirowska, as a double agent for the Polish underground.

After requesting a transfer, Morgen was instead dismissed by Himmler, ostensibly for acquitting an SS officer of the racial crime of sexual relations with an alien race, but also perhaps for meddling in Himmler's affairs. He was punished by being sent to the Wiking Division on the Eastern Front. However, in mid-1943, Himmler recalled Morgen to investigate and prosecute corruption in the concentration camp system, which had become rampant, as reflected in Himmler's notorious Posen speeches.

Morgen's investigations began with Karl-Otto Koch, the commandant of Buchenwald and Majdanek, Koch's wife Ilse Koch, sadistic SS NCO Martin Sommer, and Buchenwald's camp doctor Waldemar Hoven. Charges included theft, military insubordination, and murder. Koch was tried, convicted, and executed shortly before the end of the war. In post-war testimony, Morgen claimed the stories of Frau Koch's fetish with lampshades made of human skin were merely a legend: he had personally searched Koch's home near Buchenwald and found nothing of the kind. He later told the American journalist John Toland that he persisted in denying the story while being threatened with beatings and while actually being beaten twice by his Allied interrogators after the war.

In addition to prosecuting concentration-camp officers, Morgen sought an arrest warrant for Adolf Eichmann, as Eichmann himself confirmed at his trial in Jerusalem, but Morgen's request was rejected.

During the late summer and fall of 1943, Morgen looked into rumors that Christian Wirth – who was, unbeknownst to Morgen, supervisor of the extermination centers of Operation Reinhard – had permitted SS officers to participate in a drunken Jewish wedding near Lublin. Investigating, he found Wirth presiding over a collection center for vast quantities of clothing and valuables from the victims. On one visit to Lublin, Morgen became an accidental witness to the aftermath of Operation Harvest Festival: the liquidation of three large (Majdanek, Poniatowa, and Trawniki) and several smaller Jewish labor camps in the Lublin area. The operation, ostensibly a preemptive security measure, was said to have been ordered by Himmler on the grounds that the inmates had obtained weapons and made contact with communist partisans active in the surrounding forests. In fact the Jews in each camp were disarmed with negligible resistance and no casualties; and during the mass executions which followed, carried out on the spot over a two-day span, some 43,000 male and female prisoners were shot. Morgen arrived the day after the massacre had ended. He compiled a report from the testimony of eyewitnesses, a portion of which was read out in the pre-trial interrogation of Ernst Kaltenbrunner at Nuremberg: "the men went first, filing into one trench, and later the nude women had their own separate trenches....all passed silently and methodically through the trenches, so the executions went very quickly." (Claims that Morgen was present at the massacre itself, and tried to prevent the industrialist Walter Toebbens from intervening, are unfounded.)
Two packages of dental gold, sent by an Auschwitz dental technician to his wife, had been confiscated by postal inspectors and passed on to Morgen for investigation. Realizing that the gold must have been collected from Holocaust victims, Morgen sent an investigative team to Auschwitz and later visited himself, receiving a thorough tour of the killing center at Birkenau. His investigation was not popular, and a building where evidence files were stored was burned down. 
Although he could not prosecute the mass extermination of Jews – which, as he explained after the war, was legalized by order of Hitler – he still went on to prosecute the camp commandant Rudolf Höss and the Chief of the camp Gestapo, Maximilian Grabner, for crimes including murder.

Morgen's investigations were eventually halted by Heinrich Himmler, who assigned him to a different position. Some SS officials had wanted him sent to a concentration camp.

Post-war
After the war, Morgen was a witness for the defense at the trial of Nazi war criminals at the International Military Tribunal in Nuremberg, the trial of SS WVHA members, and the 1965 Auschwitz trial in Frankfurt–am–Main.

Morgen claimed after the war that his prosecutions were an attempt to impede the mass extermination, and two scholars (Herlinde Pauer-Studer and David Velleman, who wrote a biography about Morgen) found this explanation credible in light of the evidence.  However, the reason for Morgen's opposition can be questioned, and the scholars noted that Morgen "deplored the concentration camp system not in principle but for its corrupting effects on individuals who went on to commit individual crimes."

After the Nuremberg trials, he continued his legal career in Frankfurt, though not before he was himself brutally beaten, arrested and taken into custody on January 28, 1946, in Ludwigsburg. Because of his membership and high rank in the SS he was brought before a Denazification tribunal in 1948. He defended himself with the claim he had become a lawyer "to serve justice" and told the court he had fought against "crimes against humanity". The court decided to classify him as an Entlastete (innocent) and he was released. A revision of the trial against him took place in 1950 by the district court of Nord-Württemberg. This time, he was indicted as a Mitläufer (follower), but he remained a free man.

Additionally, the district court of Frankfurt am Main opened three legal investigations against Morgen. He was accused of involvement in the deportation of Hungarian Jews and of participating in a medical experiment on Russian prisoners of war in Buchenwald. In the absence of evidence, he was not prosecuted.

Morgen appeared in the TV series "World at War", including in the programme "Hitler's Germany : Total War 1939 - 1945" (Part 5 DVD 1 in the DVD boxed set). In the latter, he said he could not understand why Germany kept fighting when it was obvious that the war was lost, and blamed the leaders of the regime.

He died on 4 February 1982.

Nazis indicted by Konrad Morgen

Hans Aumeier – Tried, convicted and executed in 1948 by the Polish government
Hauptscharführer Johann Blank – Buchenwald officer, indicted along with Koch. Hanged himself while awaiting trial on 15 February 1944.
Hermann Florstedt – Commandant of Majdanek – sentenced to death, possibly executed in 1945
Amon Göth – Commandant of the Kraków-Płaszów concentration camp, removed from his position on charges of corruption and excess cruelty. The charges were later dropped due to Germany's looming defeat. Göth was transferred to a mental hospital. He was arrested there by U.S. soldiers and extradited to Poland, where he was sentenced to death and executed in 1946.
Maximilian Grabner – Head of Political Section in Auschwitz – accused of murder but not sentenced. Grabner was hanged on 28 January 1948 in Poland.
Adam Grünewald – Commandant of Herzogenbusch concentration camp – found guilty of maltreatment of prisoners and posted to a penal unit; killed in 1945
Hermann Hackmann – in charge of protective custody in Majdanek – condemned to death for murder but eventually posted to a penal unit; died 1994 
Karl-Otto Koch – Commandant of Buchenwald and Majdanek – executed in 1945 for three unauthorized murders and embezzlement
Karl Künstler – Commandant of Flossenbürg concentration camp – dismissed for drunkenness and debauchery; missing in 1945
Hans Loritz – Commandant of Oranienburg – proceedings initiated on suspicion of arbitrary killing; committed suicide in 1946
Alexander Piorkowski – Commandant of the Dachau concentration camp – accused of murder but not sentenced; executed in 1948
Martin Sommer – Buchenwald Hauptscharführer and depraved sadist and murderer, indicted along with Koch; sentenced to a penal unit and transferred to the Russian Front and wounded; later served time in prison but died in a nursing home in 1988

Footnotes

References
 Morgen's testimony at the Nuremberg Trial of German Major War Criminals, Day 197, 7 August 1946. From The Avalon Project of Yale Law School.
 and J. David Velleman, Konrad Morgen: the Conscience of a Nazi Judge (Palgrave 2015)

External links
 
 Thames Television interview from 1972

1909 births
1982 deaths
Jurists from Frankfurt
The Hague Academy of International Law people
SS-Sturmbannführer
German prosecutors
People from Hesse-Nassau
Judges in the Nazi Party
Waffen-SS personnel